Ambohimera is a town and commune in Madagascar. It belongs to the district of Ifanadiana, which is a part of the region of Vatovavy. The population of the commune was 13,983 in the 2018.

Only primary schooling is available. majority 95% of the population of the commune are farmers. The most important crops are cassava and rice, while other important agricultural products are bananas, coffee and sugarcane. Services provide employment for 5% of the population.

References and notes 

Populated places in Vatovavy